The College Hill West Historic District comprises a primarily residential neighborhood in Corvallis, Oregon, United States.

The district was listed on the National Register of Historic Places in 2002.

See also
College Hill High School (Corvallis, Oregon)
J. Leo Fairbanks House (Corvallis, Oregon)
John Bexell House
National Register of Historic Places listings in Benton County, Oregon

References

External links

National Register of Historic Places in Benton County, Oregon
Historic districts on the National Register of Historic Places in Oregon
Corvallis, Oregon